Ray Nazarro (aka "Ray" and "Nat;" né Raymond Alfred Nazarro; September 25, 1902 – September 8, 1986) was an American film and television director, producer, and screenwriter. Budd Boetticher called him a "ten-day picture guy."

Career 
Born in Boston, Nazarro entered the movie business during the silent era. He initially worked in two-reelers. In 1945 he became a feature-film director at Columbia Pictures, beginning with Outlaws of the Rockies. 

Nazarro was one of Hollywood's busiest directors, directing as many as 13 pictures in one year. He made budget westerns almost exclusively. From 1945 to 1948 he alternated between directing action westerns with Columbia's leading cowboy star Charles Starrett and directing the "rural rhythm" band The Hoosier Hot Shots in a series of musical-comedy westerns. When the musical series lapsed in 1948, Nazarro concentrated on the Starrett westerns, now featuring the Durango Kid character.

In 1950 Nazarro was assigned a non-western "B" picture, David Harding, Counterspy. This resulted in Nazarro receiving more non-western assignments and slightly higher budgets. He was also entrusted with more ambitious western stories, with an emphasis on action but also a serious, elegiac view of the West, like Al Jennings of Oklahoma (1951) starring Dan Duryea.

In 1952, Nazarro received an Academy Award nomination for Academy Award for Best Story for Bullfighter and the Lady. Budd Boetticher, who had been a bullfighter, told his life story to Nazarro when he was working for him as an assistant director. Boetticher says he wrote it down, and Nazarro typed it up and sold the project to Dore Schary at MGM. Boetticher said that was the reason for Nazarro getting screen credit.

When Columbia suspended B-western production in 1952, Nazarro's contract with Columbia ended after he had made around 60 films for the studio. He next made Gun Belt for United Artists and followed that with The Bandits of Corsica, also for UA, and Kansas Pacific for Allied Artists Pictures, although both were released before Gun Belt. He continued making films for UA and Columbia until Apache Territory (1958). He also made The Hired Gun (1957) for MGM.

In the late 1950s, with the market for B-westerns drying up in America, Nazarro restarted his career in Europe, making spaghetti westerns. He also began working in television. His last film was the German-made Jayne Mansfield thriller Dog Eat Dog, released in 1964.

Nazarro died on September 8, 1986, and is buried in Chapel of the Pines Crematory.

Selected filmography

Award nominations

References

External links

1902 births
1986 deaths
American film directors
American male screenwriters
American television directors
Television producers from Massachusetts
Burials at Chapel of the Pines Crematory
Businesspeople from Boston
Western (genre) film directors
20th-century American businesspeople
Screenwriters from Massachusetts
20th-century American male writers
20th-century American screenwriters